Émile Daniel Ruhlmann (24 January 1897 – 28 January 1975) was a French rower. He competed in the men's eight event at the 1920 Summer Olympics.

References

External links
 

1897 births
1975 deaths
French male rowers
Olympic rowers of France
Rowers at the 1920 Summer Olympics
Sportspeople from Strasbourg